Moshe Weinfeld  (also Weinfield, Hebrew: משה ויינפלד) (August 27, 1925 - April 29, 2009), was a professor of Bible at the Hebrew University of Jerusalem. In 1994, he won the Israel Prize for Bible.

Biography
Moshe Weinfeld was born in Nowy Sącz, Poland. 
In 1965, Weinfeld earned a PhD at the Hebrew University of Jerusalem. In 1969, he was appointed senior lecturer in Hebrew University's Bible department.

Weinfeld taught at the Jewish Theological Seminary of America (1967–1969); Brandeis University (1968); University of California, San Diego (1981); University of California, Berkeley (1989).

Awards and recognition

 In 1993, Weinfeld was awarded the Ben-Zvi Prize for the History of Palestine for his Hebrew book From Joshua to Josiah: Turning Points in the History of Israel From the Conquest of the Land Until the Fall of Judah, Jerusalem: Magnes Press (1992).
 In 1994, he was awarded the Israel Prize, for Bible.

Published works

Deuteronomy and the Deuteronomic School, Oxford: Clarendon (1972)
‘Justice and Righteousness’ in Ancient Israel against the Background of Social Reforms in the Ancient Near East (Report No. 4/79), Jerusalem: Institute for Advanced Studies of the Hebrew University (1979)
Getting at the Roots of Wellhausen’s Understanding of the Law of Israel: On the 100th Anniversary of the ‘Prolegomena’ (Report No. 14/79), Jerusalem: Institute for Advanced Studies of the Hebrew University (1980)
The Organizational Pattern and the Penal Code of the Qumran Sect: A Comparison with Guilds and Religious Associations of the Hellenistic-Roman Period (NTOA, 2), Göttingen: Vandenhoeck & Ruprecht (1986)
Deuteronomy 1-11 (Anchor Bible, 5), Garden City NY: Doubleday (1991)
The Promise of the Land The Inheritance of the Land of Canaan by the Israelites Berkeley: University of California Press (1993)
Social Justice in Ancient Israel and in the Ancient Near East, Minneapolis: Fortress, Jerusalem: Magnes Press (1995)
The Place of the Law in the Religion of Ancient Israel (Vetus Testamentum Supplement), Leiden: E.J. Brill (2004)
Normative and Sectarian Judaism in the Second Temple Period, New York: T & T Clark (2005)

See also 
 List of Israel Prize recipients

References

1925 births
2009 deaths
Israeli biblical scholars
Jewish biblical scholars
Academic staff of the Hebrew University of Jerusalem
Israeli Jews
Polish emigrants to Israel
Israel Prize in biblical studies recipients
People from Nowy Sącz
20th-century Jewish biblical scholars

External links
Moshe Weinfeld: Hebrew University Faculty Page